Boxer is the second studio album by German recording artist Johannes Oerding. It was released by Columbia Records on January 28, 2011 in German-speaking Europe.

Track listing

Charts

References

2011 albums
Johannes Oerding albums